Guntur Railway Division is one of the three divisions of the South Coast Railway zone of Indian Railways. The division was sanctioned in 1995–96 and was fully operational on 1 April 2003, with its headquarters at Guntur. The Rail Vikas Bhavan in Pattabhipuram area of Guntur, serves as the office of Divisional Railway Manager. The present divisional manager is V.G.Bhooma.

History 

The Krishna Canal-Nandyal (KCC-NDL) stretch was a part of the important East-West coast link that connected Margao in Goa to Masulipatnam in the erstwhile Madras Province of British India. It was originally built to Metre Gauge by the Southern Mahratta Railway (later the Madras and Southern Mahratta Railway-MSMR) during 1889–90. The track passed through the Nallamala Hills and as a result quite a few major engineering works were undertaken in the course of the railroad construction, the most impressive of them being the massive Dorabavi Viaduct and the Bogada Tunnel, both of them about 30 km from Nandyal. This section was converted to Broad Gauge during 1993–95. The gauge conversion was a difficult task owing to the difficult terrain. The old alignment between Gazulapalli and Diguvametta was abandoned and a new Bogada tunnel, about 1.6 km in length and a new Dorabavi Viaduct located at a much lower altitude were constructed at a huge expense. The railway passes through the historic Cumbum Tank, starting from Cumbum railway station and spread over an area of 7 km. It is one of the most picturesque valleys in Guntur-Nandyal section of South Central Railway.

The Guntur-Macherla section was opened in 1930, by the Madras and Southern Mahratta Railway to serve the backward inner Telangana region. It too was originally metre gauge and was converted to  broad gauge in 1992–93. This section was used for the transport of limestone, quartz &cement, primarily from Piduguralla, popularly known as the Lime City. The section from Guntur to the coastal town of Repalle was built to the broad gauge by the Madras and Southern Railway in 1916. This line connected to the East Coast main line at Tenali. The section from Tenali to Repalle was owned by Guntur District Board until 1964. The foundation stone for the 152 km long Bibinagar-Nadikudi rail project that opened an alternative route to Secunderabad from Vijayawada and connected the interior of Telangana to Hyderabad was laid by the then Prime Minister of India, Indira Gandhi on 7 April 1974. The project was finally finished in 1989 and the line commissioned a year later.

Two major bridges to span the Krishna River and Musi are located in this section. It is used by many south/east bound trains in a bid to decongest the heavily used Warangal-Vijayawada line. New rail lines are added in the region such as Nadikudi–Srikalahasti section, part of which comes under the division. This will be an alternate route to Chennai/Tirupati for Guntur City.

Jurisdiction 

The jurisdiction of the division covers the districts of Guntur, Kurnool, Prakasam in Andhra Pradesh and Yadadri Bhuvanagiri, Nalgonda in Telangana.

Sections and branch lines 

The sections and branch lines route map breakup is as follows:

Source: SCR Railway Map 2018

Under construction:
- railway line

Categorization of stations 

The list includes the stations under the jurisdiction of Guntur railway division and classified based on their respective category.

Source:

Performance and earnings 

The division operates around 200 express, passenger and freight trains every day. The primary commodity transported by the division is cement, clinker, food grains, besides coal and fertilizer. Other commodities include cotton, chillies, limestone, paddy, tobacco and timber waste. In the fiscal year 2018–19, it registered a growth of 69% freight earnings alone.

 Gross includes passenger, freight, sundry and other coaching revenues

Awards and achievements 
Rail Vikas Bhavan, the office of the divisional railway manager was awarded platinum rating by Greening and Beautification Corporation of Andhra Pradesh.

See also 

 Divisions of Indian Railways
 Vijayawada railway division

References 

 
Railway stations in Guntur railway division
Divisions of Indian Railways
2003 establishments in Andhra Pradesh
South Central Railway zone